Carlos Espinoza (born 8 March 1981) is an Argentine dancer and teacher. His dance style is based on tango milonguero. Together with Noelia Hurtado he gives tango classes at various tango festivals around the world.

One of Carlito's first tango teacher was Carlos Malone and Sergio Natario, who taught him the importance of walking.

In 1998 Carlitos began teaching in Argentina and Chile and in 2001, in Europe.

External links / sources 
 Carlitos Espinoza and Noelia Hurtado - Milonga de los Domingos - 1 March 2015
 Carlitos Espinoza and Noelia Hurtado - Tango Feast, Torquay, UK - 7 June 2015 (four songs)
 Carlitos Espinoza and Noelia Hurtado - MSTF2013, Poreč, Croatia
 Carlitos Espinoza and Noelia Hurtado - BTF 2013
 Carlitos Espinoza and Noelia Hurtado - Planetango 11, Moscow - 25 October 2013
 Carlitos Espinoza and Noelia Hurtado short introduction at festival web-site
 Carlos Espinoza facebook profile

Tango dancers
Living people
1981 births